Kulaviyode is a small village in Neyattinkara Taluk, Vellanad  Block, the Kattakada Gram Panchayat of Thiruvananthapuram district in the Indian state of Kerala. It is a part of Ambalathinkala ward.

Administration
The village comes under the Attingal Lok Sabha constituency.

References

Villages in Thiruvananthapuram district